State Route 174 (SR 174) is a secondary east–west state highway in northern Middle Tennessee. It traverses northern Davidson and much of Sumner counties.

Route description

Goodlettsville to Gallatin
SR 174 begins in Davidson County in Goodlettsville at an intersection with the US 41/US 31W/SR 41. From that point to the Gallatin city limit, road bears the name Long Hollow Pike. It goes east as a four-lane undivided highway to have an interchange with I-65 (Exit 97) before entering Sumner County. SR 174 then narrows to a two-lane highway as it leaves Goodlettsville and enters rural areas. The highway then passes through Shackle Island, where it has an intersection with SR 258. The highway continues east to enter Gallatin, where comes to an intersection and becomes concurrent with SR 386. SR 174/SR 386 then passes through several neighborhoods as a four-lane undivided highway to an interchange with SR 109. SR 386 becomes unsigned at this interchange and they continue east through neighborhoods as a narrow two-lanes road. They then become concurrent with SR 25 and turn southeast as Red River Road before entering downtown and coming to an intersection with US 31E/SR 6, where SR 386 ends and SR 174 splits off of SR 25 to follow US 31E/SR 6 north. They go northeast as Gallatin Pike as a four-lane undivided highway through a business district before SR 174 splits off of US 31E/SR 6 as North Water Avenue. SR 174 turns to a northerly path and passes through more neighborhoods as a two-lane highway before leaving Gallatin and continuing north as Dobbins Pike through rural areas.

Gallatin to the Kentucky state line
North of Gallatin, SR 174 passes through the Highland Rim, where it passes through Graball, before entering farmland and passing through Oak Grove, where it has an intersection with SR 52. It then winds its way northeast as Fairfield Road to pass through Fairfield before becoming Kentucky Route 3521 (KY 3521) at the Kentucky state line.

Major intersections

References 

Transportation in Nashville, Tennessee
Transportation in Davidson County, Tennessee
Transportation in Sumner County, Tennessee
174